Millburn distillery was a producer of single malt Scotch whisky that operated between 1807 and 1985. Its whisky was an important component of the "Mill Burn" vatted malt.

History
The distillery was founded as "Inverness Distillery" by Mr. Welsh in 1807 (sixteen years before the passage of the Excise Act of 1823, which legalized whisky distillation.) It came under the control of James Rose and Alexander MacDonald in 1825, but the company was sold off four years later.

In 1853, David Rose acquired the distillery and transferred control to his son, George Rose, in 1881. The younger Rose ran the distillery until 1892, when it was sold again to Andrew Haig & Co. In 1904, the distillery's name was officially changed to "Millburn" with the formation of the Millburn Distillery Company. In 1921, Millburn was acquired by Booth's Distillers Ltd. of London. The owners were able to rebuild and restore operation after a fire damaged the distillery in 1922.

Millburn became part of the Distillers Company Ltd. family as a result of the 1935 merger of Booth's with William Sanderson & Co., which itself was purchased by DCL in 1937. DCL moved Millburn under the control of Scottish Malt Distillers Ltd in 1943.

Millburn was closed in 1985, and in 1988 many of the buildings were demolished, to allow for the property to be re-developed.

In 1989,Whitbread opened a Beefeater restaurant named "The Auld Distillery" in one of the remaining Millburn buildings, and shortly after a Travel Inn hotel was added.  The site is no longer a Beefeater but is still owned by Premier Inn.

References

External links
Scotch Whisky
Malt Madness 

1807 establishments in Scotland
1985 disestablishments in Scotland
Companies based in Highland (council area)
Scottish malt whisky
Distilleries in Scotland
British companies disestablished in 1985
British companies established in 1807